The 2004 WCHA Men's Ice Hockey Tournament was the 45th conference playoff in league history and 50th season where a WCHA champion was crowned. The 2004 tournament was played between March 12 and March 20, 2004, at five conference arenas and the Xcel Energy Center in St. Paul, Minnesota. By winning the tournament, Minnesota was awarded the Broadmoor Trophy and received the Western Collegiate Hockey Association's automatic bid to the NCAA Tournament.

Format
The first round of the postseason tournament featured a best-of-three games format. All ten conference schools participated in the tournament with teams seeded No. 1 through No. 10 according to their final conference standing, with a tiebreaker system used to seed teams with an identical number of points accumulated. The top five seeded teams each earned home ice and hosted one of the lower seeded teams.

The winners of the first round series advanced to the Xcel Energy Center for the WCHA Final Five, the collective name for the quarterfinal, semifinal, and championship rounds. The Final Five uses a single-elimination format. Teams were re-seeded No. 1 through No. 5 according to the final regular season conference standings, with the top three teams automatically advancing to the semifinals.

Conference standings
Note: PTS = Points; GP = Games played; W = Wins; L = Losses; T = Ties; GF = Goals For; GA = Goals Against

Bracket
Teams are reseeded after the first round

Note: * denotes overtime period(s)

First round

(1) North Dakota vs. (10) Michigan Tech

(2) Minnesota-Duluth vs. (9) Minnesota State-Mankato

(3) Wisconsin vs. (8) Alaska-Anchorage

(4) Denver vs. (7) Colorado College

(5) Minnesota vs. (6) St. Cloud State

Quarterfinal

(7) Colorado College vs. (8) Alaska-Anchorage

Semifinals

(1) North Dakota vs. (8) Alaska-Anchorage

(2) Minnesota-Duluth vs. (5) Minnesota

Third place

(2) Minnesota-Duluth vs. (8) Alaska-Anchorage

Championship

(1) North Dakota vs. (5) Minnesota

Tournament awards

All-Tournament Team
F Zach Parise (North Dakota)
F Danny Irmen (Minnesota)
F Brandon Bochenski (North Dakota)
D Matt Jones (North Dakota)
D Keith Ballard (Minnesota)
G Kellen Briggs* (Minnesota)
* Most Valuable Player(s)

See also
Western Collegiate Hockey Association men's champions

References

External links
WCHA official site 
2003–04 WCHA Standings
2003–04 NCAA Standings

WCHA Men's Ice Hockey Tournament
WCHA Men's Ice Hockey Tournament